Tove Agnes Christense Wallenstrøm (January 12, 1915 in Copenhagen – March 5, 2013) was a Danish actress.

Filmography 
 Han, hun og Hamlet – 1932
 Københavnere – 1933
 5 raske piger – 1933
 Provinsen kalder – 1935
Prisoner Number One – 1935
 Frøken Vildkat – 1942

Notes and references 

1915 births
2013 deaths
Danish actresses
Danish film actresses
Actresses from Copenhagen